Haihui Temple is a Buddhist temple located in Yuhu District, Xiangtan, Hunan, China. It is the site of Xiangtan Buddhist Association.

History
According to the Xiangtan County Annals, the temple's history stretches back to the Yuan dynasty (1271–1368), founded by Shi Puzhong. It was rebuilt by Shi Zongyuan during the late Ming dynasty (1368–1644). At that time, there are two branch temples under its administration, namely Daofeng Temple and Juelin Temple.

After the establishment of the Republic of China in 1912, a Buddhist school was set up in the temple. In 1917, it became the Haihui School. The temple was restored by Shi Lingwu in the 1930s. Shi Jing'an, the Venerable Master of the Buddhist Association of the Republic of China, once lived here.

After the founding of the Communist State, in 1952, due to no freedom of religious belief in China, two Buddhist nuns, Shi Liancang and Shi Shaozong, forced to use the temple for producting cotton fabrics. In 1962, it was designated as a provincial cultural relic preservation organ by the Hunan government. During the ten-year Cultural Revolution, it was devastated by the Red Guards. After the 3rd Plenary Session of the 11th Central Committee of the Communist Party of China, according to the national policy of free religious belief, the temple was refurbished by Shi Shaozong and was officially reopened to the public. In 1995, Hunan government listed it as a "Key Buddhist Temple in Hunan Province".

Architecture
Along the central axis are the Shanmen, Four Heavenly Kings Hall, Mahavira Hall. There are over 10 halls and rooms on both sides, including Guanyin Hall, Buddhist Texts Library, Monastic Dining Hall, Monastic Reception Hall and Meditation Hall.

Gallery

References

Buddhist temples in Hunan
Buildings and structures in Xiangtan
Tourist attractions in Xiangtan
21st-century establishments in China
21st-century Buddhist temples